The 1971 Boston Red Sox season was the 71st season in the franchise's Major League Baseball history. The Red Sox finished third in the American League East with a record of 85 wins and 77 losses, 18 games behind the Baltimore Orioles, who went on to win the AL championship.

Offseason 
 December 3, 1970: Carmen Fanzone was traded by the Red Sox to the Chicago Cubs for Phil Gagliano.
 December 31, 1970: Chuck Hartenstein was purchased from the Red Sox by the Chicago White Sox.
 January 13, 1971: John Tamargo was drafted by the Red Sox in the 3rd round of the 1971 Major League Baseball Draft (Secondary Phase), but did not sign.
 March 31, 1971: Tony Muser and Vicente Romo were traded by the Red Sox to the Chicago White Sox for Duane Josephson and Danny Murphy.

Regular season

Highlights 
In the second year of Eddie Kasko's management, the Red Sox finished 16 games behind the eventual American League champions Baltimore Orioles. The Sox did not have a .300 hitter in 1971, with Reggie Smith's .283 batting average being the best among their regulars. Tony Conigliaro, his health still a question, had been traded the previous October to the California Angels for reliever Ken Tatum and rookie infielder Doug Griffin. Conigliaro played in 74 games for the Angels in 1971 but then had to give up baseball, his sight having deteriorated greatly. Tatum was 2–4 with the Red Sox, and Griffin batted .244, while becoming the regular second baseman.

Highlights of an otherwise forgettable season included the late arrival of a big catcher from Bellows Falls, Vermont, Carlton Fisk, who got into 14 games for the 1971 Sox and hit two home runs. Making a bigger splash was a utility fielder who had been acquired in 1970 from the New York Yankees but came into his own in 1971. John Kennedy hit .272, with five homers and 22 RBIs, and was nicknamed "Super Sub".

Another bright spot for the Sox in '71 was Jim Lonborg's winning 10 games (and losing 7). But Sonny Siebert, a pitcher acquired in a deal with the Cleveland Indians in 1969, was the top hurler for Boston, winning 16 games. A feisty left-hander, Sparky Lyle was 6–4, with 16 saves and a 2.77 ERA.

Season standings

Record vs. opponents

Notable transactions 
 April 7, 1971: Tom Satriano was released by the Red Sox.
 May 17, 1971: Luis Tiant was signed as a free agent by the Red Sox.

Opening Day lineup 

Source:

Roster

Statistical leaders 

Source:

Batting 

Source:

Pitching 

Source:

Awards and honors 
George Scott, Gold Glove Award (1B)
Carl Yastrzemski, Gold Glove Award (OF)

Farm system 

Source:

References

External links 
1971 Boston Red Sox team page at Baseball Reference
1971 Boston Red Sox season at baseball-almanac.com

Boston Red Sox seasons
Boston Red Sox
Boston Red Sox
Red Sox